Carles Sans López (born May 25, 1975 in Barcelona, Spain) is a former water polo player from Spain, who was a member of the national team that won the gold medal at the 1996 Summer Olympics in Atlanta, United States.

See also
 Spain men's Olympic water polo team records and statistics
 List of Olympic champions in men's water polo
 List of Olympic medalists in water polo (men)
 List of world champions in men's water polo
 List of World Aquatics Championships medalists in water polo

References
 Spanish Olympic Committee

External links
 

1975 births
Living people
Water polo players from Barcelona
Spanish male water polo players
Water polo drivers
Water polo players at the 1996 Summer Olympics
Medalists at the 1996 Summer Olympics
Olympic gold medalists for Spain in water polo
World Aquatics Championships medalists in water polo
20th-century Spanish people
Sportsmen from Catalonia